The McDonnell Douglas F-4 Phantom II is an American tandem two-seat, twin-engine, all-weather, long-range supersonic jet interceptor and fighter-bomber originally developed by McDonnell Aircraft for the United States Navy. Proving highly adaptable, it entered service with the Navy in 1961 before it was adopted by the United States Marine Corps and the United States Air Force, and by the mid-1960s it had become a major part of their air arms. Phantom production ran from 1958 to 1981 with a total of 5,195 aircraft built, making it the most produced American supersonic military aircraft in history, and cementing its position as an iconic combat aircraft of the Cold War.

The Phantom is a large fighter with a top speed of over Mach 2.2. It can carry more than 18,000 pounds (8,400 kg) of weapons on nine external hardpoints, including air-to-air missiles, air-to-ground missiles, and various bombs. The F-4, like other interceptors of its time, was initially designed without an internal cannon. Later models incorporated an M61 Vulcan rotary cannon. Beginning in 1959, it set 15 world records for in-flight performance, including an absolute speed record and an absolute altitude record.

The F-4 was used extensively during the Vietnam War.  It served as the principal air superiority fighter for the U.S. Air Force, Navy, and Marine Corps and became important in the ground-attack and aerial reconnaissance roles late in the war.  During the Vietnam War, one U.S. Air Force pilot, two weapon systems officers (WSOs), one U.S. Navy pilot and one radar intercept officer (RIO) became aces by achieving five aerial kills against enemy fighter aircraft. The F-4 continued to form a major part of U.S. military air power throughout the 1970s and 1980s, being gradually replaced by more modern aircraft such as the F-15 Eagle and F-16 Fighting Falcon in the U.S. Air Force, the F-14 Tomcat in the U.S. Navy, and the F/A-18 Hornet in the U.S. Navy and U.S. Marine Corps.

The F-4 Phantom II remained in use by the U.S. in the reconnaissance and Wild Weasel (Suppression of Enemy Air Defenses) roles in the 1991 Gulf War, finally leaving service in 1996.  It was also the only aircraft used by both U.S. flight demonstration teams: the United States Air Force Thunderbirds (F-4E) and the United States Navy Blue Angels (F-4J). The F-4 was also operated by the armed forces of 11 other nations. Israeli Phantoms saw extensive combat in several Arab–Israeli conflicts, while Iran used its large fleet of Phantoms, acquired before the fall of the Shah, in the Iran–Iraq War. As of 2021, 63 years after its first flight, the F-4 remains in active service with the air forces of Iran, South Korea, Greece, and Turkey. The aircraft has most recently been in service against the Islamic State group in the Middle East.

Development

Origins 
In 1952, McDonnell's Chief of Aerodynamics, Dave Lewis, was appointed by CEO Jim McDonnell to be the company's preliminary design manager. With no new aircraft competitions on the horizon, internal studies concluded the Navy had the greatest need for a new and different aircraft type: an attack fighter.

In 1953, McDonnell Aircraft began work on revising its F3H Demon naval fighter, seeking expanded capabilities and better performance. The company developed several projects, including a variant powered by a Wright J67 engine, and variants powered by two Wright J65 engines, or two General Electric J79 engines.  The J79-powered version promised a top speed of Mach 1.97. On 19 September 1953, McDonnell approached the United States Navy with a proposal for the "Super Demon". Uniquely, the aircraft was to be modular, as it could be fitted with one- or two-seat noses for different missions, with different nose cones to accommodate radar, photo cameras, four 20 mm (.79 in) cannon, or 56 FFAR unguided rockets in addition to the nine hardpoints under the wings and the fuselage. The Navy was sufficiently interested to order a full-scale mock-up of the F3H-G/H, but felt that the upcoming Grumman XF9F-9 and Vought XF8U-1 already satisfied the need for a supersonic fighter.

The McDonnell design was therefore reworked into an all-weather fighter-bomber with 11 external hardpoints for weapons and on 18 October 1954, the company received a letter of intent for two YAH-1 prototypes. Then on 26 May 1955, four Navy officers arrived at the McDonnell offices and, within an hour, presented the company with an entirely new set of requirements. Because the Navy already had the Douglas A-4 Skyhawk for ground attack and F-8 Crusader for dogfighting, the project now had to fulfill the need for an all-weather fleet defense interceptor. A second crewman was added to operate the powerful radar; designers believed that air combat in the next war would overload solo pilots with information.

XF4H-1 prototype

The XF4H-1 was designed to carry four semi-recessed AAM-N-6 Sparrow III radar-guided missiles, and to be powered by two J79-GE-8 engines. As in the McDonnell F-101 Voodoo, the engines sat low in the fuselage to maximize internal fuel capacity and ingested air through fixed geometry intakes. The thin-section wing had a leading edge sweep of 45° and was equipped with blown flaps for better low-speed handling.

Wind tunnel testing had revealed lateral instability, requiring the addition of 5° dihedral to the wings. To avoid redesigning the titanium central section of the aircraft, McDonnell engineers angled up only the outer portions of the wings by 12°, which averaged to the required 5° over the entire wingspan. The wings also received the distinctive "dogtooth" for improved control at high angles of attack. The all-moving tailplane was given 23° of anhedral to improve control at high angles of attack, while still keeping the tailplane clear of the engine exhaust. In addition, air intakes were equipped with one fixed ramp and one variable geometry ramp with angle scheduled to give maximum pressure recovery between Mach 1.4 and Mach 2.2. Airflow matching between the inlet and engine was achieved by bypassing the engine as secondary air into the exhaust nozzle. All-weather intercept capability was achieved with the AN/APQ-50 radar.

On 25 July 1955, the Navy ordered two XF4H-1 test aircraft and five YF4H-1 pre-production examples. The Phantom made its maiden flight on 27 May 1958 with Robert C. Little at the controls. A hydraulic problem precluded the retraction of the landing gear, but subsequent flights went more smoothly. Early testing resulted in redesign of the air intakes, including the distinctive addition of 12,500 holes to "bleed off" the slow-moving boundary layer air from the surface of each intake ramp. Series production aircraft also featured splitter plates to divert the boundary layer away from the engine intakes. The aircraft was soon in competition with the XF8U-3 Crusader III. Due to cockpit workload, the Navy wanted a two-seat aircraft and on 17 December 1958 the F4H was declared the winner. Delays with the J79-GE-8 engines meant that the first production aircraft were fitted with J79-GE-2 and −2A engines, each having 16,100 lbf (71.8 kN) of afterburning thrust.

There were proposals to name the F4H "Satan" and "Mithras". In the end, the aircraft was given the less controversial name "Phantom II", the first "Phantom" being another McDonnell jet fighter, the FH-1 Phantom. The Phantom II was briefly given the designation F-110A and named "Spectre" by the USAF, but these were not officially used and the Tri-Service aircraft designation system, F-4, was adopted in September 1962.

Production

Early in production, the radar was upgraded to the Westinghouse AN/APQ-72, an AN/APG-50 with a larger radar antenna, necessitating the bulbous nose, and the canopy was reworked to improve visibility and make the rear cockpit less claustrophobic. During its career the Phantom underwent many changes in the form of numerous variants developed.

The USN operated the F4H-1 (re-designated F-4A in 1962) with J79-GE-2 and -2A engines of 16,100 lbf (71.62 kN) thrust and later builds receiving -8 engines. A total of 45 F-4As were built; none saw combat, and most ended up as test or training aircraft. The USN and USMC received the first definitive Phantom, the F-4B which was equipped with the Westinghouse APQ-72 radar (pulse only), a Texas Instruments AAA-4 Infrared search and track pod under the nose, an AN/AJB-3 bombing system and powered by J79-GE-8,-8A and -8B engines of 10,900 lbf (48.5 kN) dry and 16,950 lbf (75.4 kN) afterburner (reheat) with the first flight on 25 March 1961. 649 F-4Bs were built with deliveries beginning in 1961 and VF-121 Pacemakers receiving the first examples at NAS Miramar.

The USAF received Phantoms as the result of Defense Secretary Robert McNamara's push to create a unified fighter for all branches of the US military. After an F-4B won the "Operation Highspeed" fly-off against the Convair F-106 Delta Dart, the USAF borrowed two Naval F-4Bs, temporarily designating them F-110A in January 1962, and developed requirements for their own version. Unlike the US Navy's focus on air-to-air interception in the Fleet Air Defense (FAD) mission, the USAF emphasized both an air-to-air and an air-to-ground fighter-bomber role. With McNamara's unification of designations on 18 September 1962, the Phantom became the F-4 with the naval version designated F-4B and USAF F-4C. The first Air Force Phantom flew on 27 May 1963, exceeding Mach 2 on its maiden flight.

The F-4J improved both air-to-air and ground-attack capability; deliveries begun in 1966 and ended in 1972 with 522 built. It was equipped with J79-GE-10 engines with 17,844 lbf (79.374 kN) thrust, the Westinghouse AN/AWG-10 Fire Control System (making the F-4J the first fighter in the world with operational look-down/shoot-down capability), a new integrated missile control system and the AN/AJB-7 bombing system for expanded ground attack capability.

The F-4N (updated F-4Bs) with smokeless engines and F-4J aerodynamic improvements started in 1972 under a U.S. Navy-initiated refurbishment program called "Project Bee Line" with 228 converted by 1978. The F-4S model resulted from the refurbishment of 265 F-4Js with J79-GE-17 smokeless engines of 17,900 lbf (79.379 kN), AWG-10B radar with digitized circuitry for improved performance and reliability, Honeywell AN/AVG-8 Visual Target Acquisition Set or VTAS (world's first operational Helmet Sighting System), classified avionics improvements, airframe reinforcement and leading edge slats for enhanced maneuvering. The USMC also operated the RF-4B with reconnaissance cameras with 46 built; the RF-4B flew alone and unarmed, with a requirement to fly straight and level at 5,000 feet while taking photographs. They relied on the shortcomings of the anti-aircraft defenses to survive as they were unable to make evasive maneuvers.

Phantom II production ended in the United States in 1979 after 5,195 had been built (5,057 by McDonnell Douglas and 138 in Japan by Mitsubishi). Of these, 2,874 went to the USAF, 1,264 to the Navy and Marine Corps, and the rest to foreign customers. The last U.S.-built F-4 went to South Korea, while the last F-4 built was an F-4EJ built by Mitsubishi Heavy Industries in Japan and delivered on 20 May 1981. As of 2008, 631 Phantoms were in service worldwide, while the Phantoms were in use as a target drone (specifically QF-4Cs) operated by the U.S. military until 21 December 2016, when the Air Force officially ended use of the type.

World records

To show off their new fighter, the Navy led a series of record-breaking flights early in Phantom development: All in all, the Phantom set 16 world records. Five of the speed records remained unbeaten until the F-15 Eagle appeared in 1975.
 Operation Top Flight: On 6 December 1959, the second XF4H-1 performed a zoom climb to a world record 98,557 ft (30,040 m). He then shut down the engines and glided to the peak altitude. As the aircraft fell through 70,000 ft (21,300 m), Flint restarted the engines and resumed normal flight.
 On 5 September 1960, an F4H-1 averaged 1,216.78 mph (1,958.16 km/h) over a 500 km (311 mi) closed-circuit course.
 On 25 September 1960, an F4H-1F averaged 1,390.24 mph (2,237.37 km/h) over a 100 km (62.1 mi) closed-circuit course. FAIRecord File Number 8898.
 Operation LANA: To celebrate the 50th anniversary of Naval aviation (L is the Roman numeral for 50 and ANA stood for Anniversary of Naval Aviation) on 24 May 1961, Phantoms flew across the continental United States in under three hours and included several tanker refuelings. The fastest of the aircraft averaged 869.74 mph (1,400.28 km/h) and completed the trip in 2 hours 47 minutes, earning the pilot (and future NASA Astronaut), Lieutenant Richard Gordon, USN and RIO, Lieutenant Bobbie Young, USN, the 1961 Bendix trophy.
 Operation Sageburner: On 28 August 1961, a F4H-1F Phantom II averaged 1,452.777 kilometers per hour (902.714 miles per hour) over a 3 mi (4.82 km) course flying below  at all times. Commander J.L. Felsman, USN was killed during the first attempt at this record on 18 May 1961 when his aircraft disintegrated in the air after pitch damper failure.
 Operation Skyburner: On 22 November 1961, a modified Phantom with water injection, piloted by Lt. Col. Robert B. Robinson, set an absolute world record average speed over a 20-mile (32.2 km) long 2-way straight course of 1,606.342 mph (2,585.086 km/h).
All High Jump records were set by F4H-1 production number 108 (Bureau Number 148423). Two of the records were set by future distinguished NASA astronaut LCdr John Young.

Design

Overview

The F-4 Phantom is a tandem-seat fighter-bomber designed as a carrier-based interceptor to fill the U.S. Navy's fleet defense fighter role. Innovations in the F-4 included an advanced pulse-Doppler radar and extensive use of titanium in its airframe.

Despite imposing dimensions and a maximum takeoff weight of over 60,000 lb (27,000 kg), the F-4 has a top speed of Mach 2.23 and an initial climb rate of over 41,000 ft/min (210 m/s). The F-4's nine external hardpoints have a capability of up to 18,650 pounds (8,480 kg) of weapons, including air-to-air and air-to-surface missiles, and unguided, guided, and thermonuclear weapons. Like other interceptors of its day, the F-4 was designed without an internal cannon.

The baseline performance of a Mach 2-class fighter with long-range and a bomber-sized payload would be the template for the next generation of large and light/middle-weight fighters optimized for daylight air combat.

Flight characteristics

"Speed is life" was F-4 pilots' slogan, as the Phantom's greatest advantage in air combat was acceleration and thrust, which permitted a skilled pilot to engage and disengage from the fight at will. MiGs usually could outturn the F-4 because of the high drag on the Phantom's airframe, as a massive fighter aircraft designed to fire radar-guided missiles from beyond visual range, the F-4 lacked the agility of its Soviet opponents and was subject to adverse yaw during hard maneuvering. Although the F-4 was subject to irrecoverable spins during aileron rolls, pilots reported the aircraft to be very responsive and easy to fly on the edge of its performance envelope. In 1972, the F-4E model was upgraded with leading edge slats on the wing, greatly improving high angle of attack maneuverability at the expense of top speed.

The J79 had a reduced time lag between the pilot advancing the throttle, from idle to maximum thrust, and the engine producing maximum thrust compared to earlier engines. While landing on  John Chesire's tailhook missed the arresting gear as he (mistakenly) reduced thrust to idle. He then slammed the throttle to full afterburner, the engine's response time being enough to return to full thrust quickly, and he was able get the Phantom airborne again successfully (bolter). The J79 produced noticeable amounts of black smoke (at mid-throttle/cruise settings), a severe disadvantage in that it made it easier for the enemy to spot the aircraft. Two decades after the aircraft entered service this was solved on the F-4S, which was fitted with the −10A engine variant with a smokeless combustor.

The lack of an internal gun "was the biggest mistake on the F-4", Chesire said; "Bullets are cheap and tend to go where you aim them. I needed a gun, and I really wished I had one." Marine Corps General John R. Dailey recalled that "everyone in RF-4s wished they had a gun on the aircraft." For a brief period, doctrine held that turning combat would be impossible at supersonic speeds and little effort was made to teach pilots air combat maneuvering. In reality, engagements quickly became subsonic, as pilots would slow down in an effort to get behind their adversaries. Furthermore, the relatively new heat-seeking and radar-guided missiles at the time were frequently reported as unreliable and pilots had to fire multiple missiles just to hit one enemy fighter. To compound the problem, rules of engagement in Vietnam precluded long-range missile attacks in most instances, as visual identification was normally required. Many pilots found themselves on the tail of an enemy aircraft, but too close to fire short-range Falcons or Sidewinders. Although by 1965 USAF F-4Cs began carrying SUU-16 external gunpods containing a 20 mm (.79 in) M61A1 Vulcan Gatling cannon, USAF cockpits were not equipped with lead-computing gunsights until the introduction of the SUU-23, virtually assuring a miss in a maneuvering fight. Some Marine Corps aircraft carried two pods for strafing. In addition to the loss of performance due to drag, combat showed the externally mounted cannon to be inaccurate unless frequently boresighted, yet far more cost-effective than missiles. The lack of a cannon was finally addressed by adding an internally mounted 20 mm (.79 in) M61A1 Vulcan on the F-4E.

Costs

Note: Original amounts were in 1965 U.S. dollars. The figures in these tables have been adjusted for inflation to the current year.

Operational history

United States Air Force

In USAF service, the F-4 was initially designated the F-110A prior to the introduction of the 1962 United States Tri-Service aircraft designation system. The USAF quickly embraced the design and became the largest Phantom user. The first USAF Phantoms in Vietnam were F-4Cs from the 43rd Tactical Fighter Squadron  arrived in December 1964.

Unlike the U.S. Navy and U.S. Marine Corps, which flew the Phantom with a Naval Aviator (pilot) in the front seat and a naval flight officer as a radar intercept officer (RIO) in the back seat, the USAF initially flew its Phantoms with a rated Air Force Pilot in front and back seats. Pilots usually did not like flying in the back seat; while the GIB, or "guy in back", could fly and ostensibly land the aircraft, he had fewer flight instruments and a very restricted forward view. The Air Force later assigned a rated Air Force Navigator qualified as a weapon/targeting systems officer (later designated as weapon systems officer or WSO) in the rear seat instead of another pilot.

On 10 July 1965, F-4Cs of the 45th Tactical Fighter Squadron, 15th TFW, on temporary assignment in Ubon, Thailand, scored the USAF's first victories against North Vietnamese MiG-17s using AIM-9 Sidewinder air-to-air missiles. On 26 April 1966, an F-4C from the 480th Tactical Fighter Squadron scored the first aerial victory by a U.S. aircrew over a North Vietnamese MiG-21 "Fishbed". On 24 July 1965, another Phantom from the 45th Tactical Fighter Squadron became the first American aircraft to be downed by an enemy SAM, and on 5 October 1966 an 8th Tactical Fighter Wing F-4C became the first U.S. jet lost to an air-to-air missile, fired by a MiG-21.

Early aircraft suffered from leaks in wing fuel tanks that required re-sealing after each flight and 85 aircraft were found to have cracks in outer wing ribs and stringers. There were also problems with aileron control cylinders, electrical connectors, and engine compartment fires. Reconnaissance RF-4Cs made their debut in Vietnam on 30 October 1965, flying the hazardous post-strike reconnaissance missions. The USAF Thunderbirds used the F-4E from the 1969 season until 1974.

Although the F-4C was essentially identical to the Navy/Marine Corps F-4B in-flight performance and carried the AIM-9 Sidewinder missiles, USAF-tailored F-4Ds initially arrived in June 1967 equipped with AIM-4 Falcons. However, the Falcon, like its predecessors, was designed to shoot down heavy bombers flying straight and level. Its reliability proved no better than others and its complex firing sequence and limited seeker-head cooling time made it virtually useless in combat against agile fighters. The F-4Ds reverted to using Sidewinders under the "Rivet Haste" program in early 1968, and by 1972 the AIM-7E-2 "Dogfight Sparrow" had become the preferred missile for USAF pilots. Like other Vietnam War Phantoms, the F-4Ds were urgently fitted with radar warning receivers to detect the Soviet-built S-75 Dvina SAMs.

From the initial deployment of the F-4C to Southeast Asia, USAF Phantoms performed both air superiority and ground attack roles, supporting not only ground troops in South Vietnam, but also conducting bombing sorties in Laos and North Vietnam. As the F-105 force underwent severe attrition between 1965 and 1968, the bombing role of the F-4 proportionately increased until after November 1970 (when the last F-105D was withdrawn from combat) it became the primary USAF tactical ordnance delivery system. In October 1972 the first squadron of EF-4C Wild Weasel aircraft deployed to Thailand on temporary duty. The "E" prefix was later dropped and the aircraft was simply known as the F-4C Wild Weasel.

Sixteen squadrons of Phantoms were permanently deployed between 1965 and 1973, and 17 others deployed on temporary combat assignments. Peak numbers of combat F-4s occurred in 1972, when 353 were based in Thailand. A total of 445 Air Force Phantom fighter-bombers were lost, 370 in combat and 193 of those over North Vietnam (33 to MiGs, 30 to SAMs, and 307 to AAA).

The RF-4C was operated by four squadrons, and of the 83 losses, 72 were in combat including 38 over North Vietnam (seven to SAMs and 65 to AAA). By war's end, the U.S. Air Force had lost a total of 528 F-4 and RF-4C Phantoms. When combined with U.S. Navy and Marine Corps losses of 233 Phantoms, 761 F-4/RF-4 Phantoms were lost in the Vietnam War.

On 28 August 1972, Captain Steve Ritchie became the first USAF ace of the war. On 9 September 1972, WSO Capt Charles B. DeBellevue became the highest-scoring American ace of the war with six victories. and WSO Capt Jeffrey Feinstein became the last USAF ace of the war on 13 October 1972. Upon return to the United States, DeBellevue and Feinstein were assigned to undergraduate pilot training (Feinstein was given a vision waiver) and requalified as USAF pilots in the F-4. USAF F-4C/D/E crews claimed  MiG kills in Southeast Asia (50 by Sparrow, 31 by Sidewinder, five by Falcon, 15.5 by gun, and six by other means).

On 31 January 1972, the 170th Tactical Fighter Squadron/183d Tactical Fighter Group of the Illinois Air National Guard became the first Air National Guard unit to transition to Phantoms from Republic F-84F Thunderstreaks which were found to have corrosion problems. Phantoms would eventually equip numerous tactical fighter and tactical reconnaissance units in the USAF active, National Guard, and reserve.

On 2 June 1972, a Phantom flying at supersonic speed shot down a MiG-19 over Thud Ridge in Vietnam with its cannon. At a recorded speed of Mach 1.2, Major Phil Handley's shoot down was the first and only recorded gun kill while flying at supersonic speeds.

On 15 August 1990, 24 F-4G Wild Weasel Vs and six RF-4Cs were deployed to Shaikh Isa AB, Bahrain, for Operation Desert Storm. The F-4G was the only aircraft in the USAF inventory equipped for the Suppression of Enemy Air Defenses (SEAD) role, and was needed to protect coalition aircraft from Iraq's extensive air defense system. The RF-4C was the only aircraft equipped with the ultra-long-range KS-127 LOROP (long-range oblique photography) camera, and was used for a variety of reconnaissance missions. In spite of flying almost daily missions, only one RF-4C was lost in a fatal accident before the start of hostilities. One F-4G was lost when enemy fire damaged the fuel tanks and the aircraft ran out of fuel near a friendly airbase. The last USAF Phantoms, F-4G Wild Weasel Vs from 561st Fighter Squadron, were retired on 26 March 1996. The last operational flight of the F-4G Wild Weasel was from the 190th Fighter Squadron, Idaho Air National Guard, in April 1996. The last operational USAF/ANG F-4 to land was flown by Maj Mike Webb and Maj Gary Leeder of the Idaho ANG.

Like the Navy, the Air Force has operated QF-4 target drones, serving with the 82d Aerial Targets Squadron at Tyndall Air Force Base, Florida, and Holloman Air Force Base, New Mexico. It was expected that the F-4 would remain in the target role with the 82d ATRS until at least 2015, when they would be replaced by early versions of the F-16 Fighting Falcon converted to a QF-16 configuration. Several QF-4s also retain capability as manned aircraft and are maintained in historical color schemes, being displayed as part of Air Combat Command's Heritage Flight at air shows, base open houses, and other events while serving as non-expendable target aircraft during the week. On 19 November 2013, BAE Systems delivered the last QF-4 aerial target to the Air Force. The example had been in storage for over 20 years before being converted. Over 16 years, BAE had converted 314 F-4 and RF-4 Phantom IIs into QF-4s and QRF-4s, with each aircraft taking six months to adapt. As of December 2013, QF-4 and QRF-4 aircraft had flown over 16,000 manned and 600 unmanned training sorties, with 250 unmanned aircraft being shot down in firing exercises. The remaining QF-4s and QRF-4s held their training role until the first of 126 QF-16s were delivered by Boeing. The final flight of an Air Force QF-4 from Tyndall AFB took place on 27 May 2015 to Holloman AFB. After Tyndall AFB ceased operations, the 53d Weapons Evaluation Group at Holloman became the fleet of 22 QF-4s' last remaining operator.  The base continued using them to fly manned test and unmanned live fire test support and Foreign Military Sales testing, with the final unmanned flight taking place in August 2016. The type was officially retired from US military service with a four–ship flight at Holloman during an event on 21 December 2016. The remaining QF-4s were to be demilitarized after 1 January 2017.

United States Navy

On 30 December 1960, the VF-121 "Pacemakers" at NAS Miramar became the first Phantom operator with its F4H-1Fs (F-4As). The VF-74 "Be-devilers" at NAS Oceana became the first deployable Phantom squadron when it received its F4H-1s (F-4Bs) on 8 July 1961. The squadron completed carrier qualifications in October 1961 and Phantom's first full carrier deployment between August 1962 and March 1963 aboard . The first deployable U.S. Pacific Fleet squadron to receive the F-4B was the VF-114 "Aardvarks", which participated in the September 1962 cruise aboard .

By the time of the Tonkin Gulf incident, 13 of 31 deployable navy squadrons were armed with the type. F-4Bs from  made the first Phantom combat sortie of the Vietnam War on 5 August 1964, flying bomber escort in Operation Pierce Arrow. Navy fighter pilots were unused to flying with a non-pilot RIO, but learned from air combat in Vietnam the benefits of the GiB "guy in back" or "voice in the luggage compartment" helping with the workload. The first Phantom air-to-air victory of the war took place on 9 April 1965 when an F-4B from VF-96 "Fighting Falcons" piloted by Lieutenant (junior grade) Terence M. Murphy and his RIO, Ensign Ronald Fegan, shot down a Chinese MiG-17 "Fresco". The Phantom was then shot down, probably by an AIM-7 Sparrow from one of its wingmen. There continues to be controversy over whether the Phantom was shot down by MiG guns or, as enemy reports later indicated, an AIM-7 Sparrow III from one of Murphy's and Fegan's wingmen. On 17 June 1965, an F-4B from VF-21 "Freelancers" piloted by Commander Louis Page and Lieutenant John C. Smith shot down the first North Vietnamese MiG of the war.

On 10 May 1972, Lieutenant Randy "Duke" Cunningham and Lieutenant (junior grade) William P. Driscoll flying an F-4J, call sign "Showtime 100", shot down three MiG-17s to become the first American flying aces of the war. Their fifth victory was believed at the time to be over a mysterious North Vietnamese ace, Colonel Nguyen Toon, now considered mythical. On the return flight, the Phantom was damaged by an enemy surface-to-air missile. To avoid being captured, Cunningham and Driscoll flew their burning aircraft using only the rudder and afterburner (the damage to the aircraft rendered conventional control nearly impossible), until they could eject over water.

During the war, U.S. Navy F-4 Phantom squadrons participated in 84 combat tours with F-4Bs, F-4Js, and F-4Ns. The Navy claimed 40 air-to-air victories at a cost of 73 Phantoms lost in combat (seven to enemy aircraft, 13 to SAMs, and 53 to AAA). An additional 54 Phantoms were lost in mishaps.

In 1984, all Navy F-4Ns were retired from Fleet service in deployable USN squadrons and by 1987 the last F-4Ss were retired from deployable USN squadrons. On 25 March 1986, an F-4S belonging to the VF-151 "Vigilantes," became the last active duty U.S. Navy Phantom to launch from an aircraft carrier, in this case, . On 18 October 1986, an F-4S from the VF-202 "Superheats", a Naval Reserve fighter squadron, made the last-ever Phantom carrier landing while operating aboard . In 1987, the last of the Naval Reserve-operated F-4S aircraft were replaced by F-14As. The last Phantoms in service with the Navy were QF-4N and QF-4S target drones operated by the Naval Air Warfare Center at NAS Point Mugu, California. These airframes were subsequently retired in 2004.

United States Marine Corps

The Marine Corps received its first F-4Bs in June 1962, with the "Black Knights" of VMFA-314 at Marine Corps Air Station El Toro, California becoming the first operational squadron. Marine Phantoms from VMFA-531 "Grey Ghosts" were assigned to Da Nang airbase on South Vietnam's northeast coast on 10 May 1965 and were initially assigned to provide air defense for the USMC. They soon began close air support missions (CAS) and VMFA-314 'Black Knights', VMFA-232 'Red Devils, VMFA-323 'Death Rattlers', and VMFA-542 'Bengals' soon arrived at the primitive airfield. Marine F-4 pilots claimed three enemy MiGs (two while on exchange duty with the USAF) at the cost of 75 aircraft lost in combat, mostly to ground fire, and four in accidents.

The VMCJ-1 Golden Hawks (later VMAQ-1 and VMAQ-4 which had the old RM tailcode) flew the first photo recon mission with an RF-4B variant on 3 November 1966 from Da Nang AB, South Vietnam and remained there until 1970 with no RF-4B losses and only one aircraft damaged by anti-aircraft artillery (AAA) fire. VMCJ-2 and VMCJ-3 (now VMAQ-3) provided aircraft for VMCJ-1 in Da Nang and VMFP-3 was formed in 1975 at MCAS El Toro, CA consolidating all USMC RF-4Bs in one unit that became known as "The Eyes of the Corps." VMFP-3 disestablished in August 1990 after the Advanced Tactical Airborne Reconnaissance System was introduced for the F/A-18D Hornet.

The F-4 continued to equip fighter-attack squadrons in both active and reserve Marine Corps units throughout the 1960s, 1970s and 1980s and into the early 1990s. In the early 1980s, these squadrons began to transition to the F/A-18 Hornet, starting with the same squadron that introduced the F-4 to the Marine Corps, VMFA-314 at MCAS El Toro, California. On 18 January 1992, the last Marine Corps Phantom, an F-4S in the Marine Corps Reserve, was retired by the "Cowboys" of VMFA-112 at NAS Dallas, Texas, after which the squadron was re-equipped with F/A-18 Hornets.

Aerial combat in the Vietnam War
The USAF and the US Navy had high expectations of the F-4 Phantom, assuming that the massive firepower, the best available on-board radar, the highest speed and acceleration properties, coupled with new tactics, would provide Phantoms with an advantage over the MiGs. However, in confrontations with the lighter MiG-21, F-4s did not always succeed and began to suffer losses. Over the course of the air war in Vietnam, between 3 April 1965 and 8 January 1973, each side would ultimately claim favorable kill ratios.

During the war, U.S. Navy F-4 Phantoms claimed 40 air-to-air victories at a loss of seven Phantoms to enemy aircraft. USMC F-4 pilots claimed three enemy MiGs at the cost of one aircraft in air-combat. USAF F-4 Phantom crews scored  MiG kills (including  MiG-17s, eight MiG-19s and 66 MiG-21s) at a cost of 33 Phantoms in air-combat. F-4 pilots were credited with a total of  MiG kills at a cost of 42 Phantoms in air-combat.

According to the VPAF, 103 F-4 Phantoms were shot down by MiG-21s at a cost of 54 MiG-21s downed by F-4s. During the war, the VPAF lost 131 MiGs in air combat (63 MiG-17s, eight MiG-19s and 60 MiG-21s) of which one half were by F-4s.

From 1966 to November 1968, in 46 air battles conducted over North Vietnam between F-4s and MiG-21s, VPAF claimed 27 F-4s were shot down by MiG-21s at a cost of 20 MiG-21s In 1970, one F-4 Phantom was shot down by a MiG-21. The struggle culminated on 10 May 1972, with VPAF aircraft completing 64 sorties, resulting in 15 air battles. The VPAF claimed seven F-4s were shot down, while U.S. confirmed five F-4s were lost. The Phantoms, in turn, managed to destroy two MiG-21s, three MiG-17s, and one MiG-19. On 11 May, two MiG-21s, which played the role of "bait", brought the four F-4s to two MiG-21s circling at low altitude. The MiGs quickly engaged and shot down two F-4s. On 18 May, Vietnamese aircraft made 26 sorties in eight air engagements, which cost 4 F-4 Phantoms; Vietnamese fighters on that day did not suffer losses.

Non-U.S. users

The Phantom has served with the air forces of many countries, including Australia, Egypt, Germany, United Kingdom, Greece, Iran, Israel, Japan, Spain, South Korea and Turkey.

Australia

The Royal Australian Air Force (RAAF) leased 24 USAF F-4Es from 1970 to 1973 while waiting for their order for the General Dynamics F-111C to be delivered. They were so well-liked that the RAAF considered retaining the aircraft after the F-111Cs were delivered. They were operated from RAAF Amberley by No. 1 Squadron and No. 6 Squadron.

Egypt
In 1979, the Egyptian Air Force purchased 35 former USAF F-4Es along with a number of Sparrow, Sidewinder, and Maverick missiles from the U.S. for $594 million as part of the "Peace Pharaoh" program. An additional seven surplus USAF aircraft were purchased in 1988. Three attrition replacements had been received by the end of the 1990s.

Egyptian F-4Es were retired in 2020, with their former base at Cairo West Air Base being reconfigured for the operation of F-16C/D Fighting Falcons.

Germany

The German Air Force (Luftwaffe) initially ordered the reconnaissance RF-4E in 1969, receiving a total of 88 aircraft from January 1971. In 1973, under the "Peace Rhine" program, the Luftwaffe purchased 175 units of the F-4F. The “F” variant was a more agile version of the “E”, due to its lower weight and slatted wings. However this was achieved at the expense of reduced fuel capacity, and the elimination of AIM-7 Sparrow capability. These purchases made Germany the largest export customer for the Phantom.

In 1975, Germany also received 10 F-4Es for training in the U.S. In the late 1990s, these were withdrawn from service after being replaced by F-4Fs. In 1982, the initially unarmed RF-4Es were given a secondary ground attack capability; these aircraft were retired in 1994. The F-4F was upgraded in the mid-1980s. Germany also initiated the Improved Combat Efficiency (ICE) program in 1983. The 110 ICE-upgraded F-4Fs entered service in 1992, and were expected to remain in service until 2012. All the remaining Luftwaffe Phantoms were based at Wittmund with Jagdgeschwader 71 (fighter wing 71) in Northern Germany and WTD61 at Manching. A total of 24 German F-4F Phantom IIs were operated by the 49th Tactical Fighter Wing of the USAF at Holloman AFB to train Luftwaffe crews until December 2004. Phantoms were deployed to NATO states under the Baltic Air Policing starting in 2005, 2008, 2009, 2011 and 2012.  The German Air Force retired its last F-4Fs on 29 June 2013. German F-4Fs flew 279,000 hours from entering service on 31 August 1973 until retirement.

Greece
In 1971, the Hellenic Air Force ordered brand new F-4E Phantoms, with deliveries starting in 1974. In the early 1990s, the Hellenic AF acquired surplus RF-4Es and F-4Es from the Luftwaffe and U.S. ANG.

Following the success of the German ICE program, on 11 August 1997, a contract was signed between DASA of Germany and Hellenic Aerospace Industry for the upgrade of 39 aircraft to the very similar "Peace Icarus 2000" standard. The Hellenic AF operated 34 upgraded F-4E-PI2000 (338 and 339 Squadrons) and 12 RF-4E aircraft (348 Squadron) as of September 2013.

On 5 May 2017, the Hellenic Air Force officially retired the RF-4E Phantom II during a public ceremony.

Iran

In the 1960s and 1970s when the U.S. and Iran were on friendly terms, the U.S. delivered 225 F-4D, F-4E, and RF-4E Phantoms to Iran, making it the second largest export customer. The Imperial Iranian Air Force saw at least one engagement, resulting in a loss, after an RF-4C was rammed by a Soviet MiG-21 during Project Dark Gene, an ELINT operation during the Cold War.

The Islamic Republic of Iran Air Force Phantoms saw heavy action in the Iran–Iraq War in the 1980s and were kept operational by overhaul and servicing from Iran's aerospace industry. Notable operations of Iranian F-4s during the war included Operation Scorch Sword, an attack by two F-4s against the Iraqi Osirak nuclear reactor site near Baghdad on 30 September 1980, and the attack on H3, a 4 April 1981 strike by eight Iranian F-4s against the H-3 complex of air bases in the far west of Iraq, which resulted in many Iraqi aircraft being destroyed or damaged for no Iranian losses.

On 5 June 1984, two Saudi Arabian fighter pilots shot down two Iranian F-4 fighters. The Royal Saudi Air Force pilots were flying American-built F-15s and fired air-to-air missiles to bring down the Iranian planes. The Saudi fighter pilots had Boeing KC-135 Stratotanker planes and Boeing E-3 Sentry AWACS surveillance planes assist in the encounter. The aerial fight occurred in Saudi airspace over the Persian Gulf near the Saudi island Al Arabiyah, about 60 miles northeast of Jubail.

Iranian F-4s were in use as of late 2014; the aircraft reportedly conducted air strikes on ISIS targets in the eastern Iraqi province of Diyala.

Israel

The Israeli Air Force acquired between 212 and 222 newly built and ex-USAF aircraft, and modified several as one-off special reconnaissance variants. The first F-4Es, nicknamed "Kurnass" (Sledgehammer), and RF-4Es, nicknamed "Orev" (Raven), were delivered in 1969 under the "Peace Echo I" program. Additional Phantoms arrived during the 1970s under "Peace Echo II" through "Peace Echo V" and "Nickel Grass" programs. Israeli Phantoms saw extensive combat during Arab–Israeli conflicts, first seeing action during the War of Attrition. In the 1980s, Israel began the "Kurnass 2000" modernization program which significantly updated avionics. The last Israeli F-4s were retired in 2004.

Japan
From 1968, the Japan Air Self-Defense Force (JASDF) purchased a total of 140 F-4EJ Phantoms without aerial refueling, AGM-12 Bullpup missile system, nuclear control system or ground attack capabilities. Mitsubishi built 138 under license in Japan and 14 unarmed reconnaissance RF-4Es were imported.  One of the aircraft (17-8440) was the last of the 5,195 F-4 Phantoms to be produced. It was manufactured by Mitsubishi Heavy Industries on 21 May 1981. "The Final Phantom" served with 306th Tactical Fighter Squadron and later transferred to the 301st Tactical Fighter Squadron.

Of these, 96 F-4EJs were modified to the F-4EJ  standard. 15 F-4EJ and F-4EJ Kai were converted to reconnaissance aircraft designated RF-4EJ. Japan had a fleet of 90 F-4s in service in 2007. After studying several replacement fighters the F-35A Lightning II was chosen in 2011. The 302nd Tactical Fighter Squadron became the first JASDF F-35 Squadron at Misawa Air Base when it converted from the F-4EJ Kai on 29 March 2019. The JASDF's sole aerial reconnaissance unit, the 501st Tactical Reconnaissance Squadron, retired their RF-4Es and RF-4EJs on 9 March 2020, and the unit itself dissolved on 26 March.

The 301st Tactical Fighter Squadron then became the sole user of the F-4EJ in the Air Defense Command, with their retirement originally scheduled in 2021 along with the unit's transition to the F-35A. However, on 20 November 2020, the 301st Tactical Fighter Squadron announced the earlier retirement of their remaining F-4EJs, concluding the Phantom's long-running career in the JASDF Air Defense Command.  Although retirement was announced, the 301st TFS continued operations up until 10 December 2020, with the squadron's Phantoms being decommissioned on 14 December. Two F-4EJs and a F-4EJ Kai continued to be operated by the Air Development and Test Wing in Gifu Prefecture until their retirement on 17 March 2021, marking an end of Phantom operations in Japan.

South Korea
The Republic of Korea Air Force purchased its first batch of secondhand USAF F-4D Phantoms in 1968 under the "Peace Spectator" program. The F-4Ds continued to be delivered until 1988. The "Peace Pheasant II" program also provided new-built and former USAF F-4Es.

Spain
The Spanish Air Force acquired its first batch of ex-USAF F-4C Phantoms in 1971 under the "Peace Alfa" program. Designated C.12, the aircraft were retired in 1989. At the same time, the air arm received a number of ex-USAF RF-4Cs, designated CR.12. In 1995–1996, these aircraft received extensive avionics upgrades. Spain retired its RF-4s in 2002.

Turkey

The Turkish Air Force (TAF) received 40 F-4Es in 1974, with a further 32 F-4Es and 8 RF-4Es in 1977–78 under the "Peace Diamond III" program, followed by 40 ex-USAF aircraft in "Peace Diamond IV" in 1987, and a further 40 ex-U.S. Air National Guard Aircraft in 1991. A further 32 RF-4Es were transferred to Turkey after being retired by the Luftwaffe between 1992 and 1994. In 1995, Israel Aerospace Industries (IAI) implemented an upgrade similar to Kurnass 2000 on 54 Turkish F-4Es which were dubbed the F-4E 2020 Terminator. Turkish F-4s, and more modern F-16s have been used to strike Kurdish PKK bases in ongoing military operations in Northern Iraq. On 22 June 2012, a Turkish RF-4E was shot down by Syrian air defenses while flying a reconnaissance flight near the Turkish-Syrian border. Turkey has stated the reconnaissance aircraft was in international airspace when it was shot down, while Syrian authorities stated it was inside Syrian airspace. Turkish F-4s remained in use as of 2020, and it plans to fly them at least until 2030.

On 24 February 2015, two RF-4Es crashed in the Malatya region in the southeast of Turkey, under yet unknown circumstances, killing both crew of two each. On 5 March 2015, an F-4E-2020 crashed in central Anatolia killing both crew. After the recent accidents, the TAF withdrew RF-4Es from active service. Turkey was reported to have used F-4 jets to attack PKK separatists and the ISIS capital on 19 September 2015. The Turkish Air Force has reportedly used the F-4E 2020s against the more recent Third Phase of the PKK conflict on heavy bombardment missions into Iraq on 15 November 2015, 12 January 2016, and 12 March 2016.

United Kingdom

The United Kingdom bought versions based on the U.S. Navy's F-4J for use with the Royal Air Force and the Royal Navy's Fleet Air Arm. The main differences were the use of the British Rolls-Royce Spey engines and of British-made avionics. The RN and RAF versions were given the designation F-4K and F-4M respectively, and entered service with the British military aircraft designations Phantom FG.1 (fighter/ground attack) and Phantom FGR.2 (fighter/ground attack/reconnaissance).

Initially, the FGR.2 was used in the ground attack and reconnaissance role, primarily with RAF Germany, while 43 Squadron was formed in the air defense role using the FG.1s that had been intended for the Fleet Air Arm for use aboard . The superiority of the Phantom over the English Electric Lightning in terms of both range and weapons system capability, combined with the successful introduction of the SEPECAT Jaguar, meant that, during the mid-1970s, most of the ground attack Phantoms in Germany were redeployed to the UK to replace air defense Lightning squadrons. A second RAF squadron, 111 Squadron, was formed on the FG.1 in 1979 after the disbandment of 892 NAS.

In 1982, during the Falklands War, three Phantom FGR2s of No. 29 Squadron were on active Quick Reaction Alert duty on Ascension Island to protect the base from air attack. After the Falklands War, 15 upgraded ex-USN F-4Js, known as the F-4J(UK) entered RAF service to compensate for one interceptor squadron redeployed to the Falklands.

Around 15 RAF squadrons received various marks of Phantom, many of them based in Germany. The first to be equipped was No. 228 Operational Conversion Unit at RAF Coningsby in August 1968. One noteworthy operator was No. 43 Squadron where Phantom FG1s remained the squadron equipment for 20 years, arriving in September 1969 and departing in July 1989. During this period the squadron was based at Leuchars.

The interceptor Phantoms were replaced by the Panavia Tornado F3 from the late 1980s onwards, and the last combat British Phantoms were retired in October 1992 when No. 74(F) Squadron was disbanded. Phantom FG.1 XT597 was the last British Phantom to be retired on 28 January 1994, it was used as a test jet by the Aeroplane and Armament Experimental Establishment for its whole service life.

Civilian use
Sandia National Laboratories expended an F-4 mounted on a "rocket sled" in a crash test to record the results of an aircraft impacting a reinforced concrete structure, such as a nuclear power plant.

One aircraft, an F-4D (civilian registration NX749CF), is operated by the Massachusetts-based non-profit organization Collings Foundation as a "living history" exhibit. Funds to maintain and operate the aircraft, which is based in Houston, Texas, are raised through donations/sponsorships from public and commercial parties.

After finding the Lockheed F-104 Starfighter inadequate, NASA used the F-4 to photograph and film Titan II missiles after launch from Cape Canaveral during the 1960s. Retired U.S. Air Force colonel Jack Petry described how he put his F-4 into a Mach 1.2 dive synchronized to the launch countdown, then "walked the (rocket's) contrail". Petry's Phantom stayed with the Titan for 90 seconds, reaching 68,000 feet, then broke away as the missile continued into space.

NASA's Dryden Flight Research Center acquired an F-4A on 3 December 1965. It made 55 flights in support of short programs, chase on X-15 missions and lifting body flights. The F-4 also supported a biomedical monitoring program involving 1,000 flights by NASA Flight Research Center aerospace research pilots and students of the USAF Aerospace Research Pilot School flying high-performance aircraft. The pilots were instrumented to record accurate and reliable data of electrocardiogram, respiration rate, and normal acceleration. In 1967, the Phantom supported a brief military-inspired program to determine whether an airplane's sonic boom could be directed and whether it could be used as a weapon of sorts, or at least an annoyance. NASA also flew an F-4C in a spanwise blowing study from 1983 to 1985, after which it was returned.

Variants

F-4A, B, J, N and S
Variants for the U.S. Navy and the U.S. Marine Corps. F-4B was upgraded to F-4N, and F-4J was upgraded to F-4S.
F-110 (original USAF designation for F-4C), F-4C, D and E
Variants for the U.S. Air Force. F-4E introduced an internal M61 Vulcan cannon. The F-4D and E were the most numerously produced, widely exported, and also extensively used under the Semi Automatic Ground Environment (SAGE) U.S. air defense system.
F-4G Wild Weasel V
A dedicated SEAD variant for the U.S. Air Force with updated radar and avionics, converted from F-4E. The designation F-4G was applied earlier to an entirely different U.S. Navy Phantom.
 F-4K and M
Variants for the Royal Navy and Royal Air Force, respectively, re-engined with Rolls-Royce Spey turbofan engines.
F-4EJ and RF-4EJ
Simplified F-4E exported to and license-built in Japan. Some modified for reconnaissance role, carrying photographic and/or electronic reconnaissance pods and designated RF-4EJ.
F-4F
Simplified F-4E exported to Germany.
QRF-4C, QF-4B, E, G, N and S
Retired aircraft converted into remote-controlled target drones used for weapons and defensive systems research by USAF and USN / USMC.
RF-4B, C, and E
Tactical reconnaissance variants.

Operators

Operators
 
 Hellenic Air Force – 18 F-4E AUPs in service
Andravida Air Base, Elis
338 MDV
 
 Islamic Republic of Iran Air Force – 62 F-4D, F-4E, and RF-4Es in service
 Bandar Abbas Air Base, Hormozgan Province
 91st Tactical Fighter Squadron (F-4E)
 Bushehr Air Base, Bushehr Province
 61st Tactical Fighter Squadron (F-4E)
 Chabahar Konarak Air Base, Sistan and Baluchestan Province
 101st Tactical Fighter Squadron (F-4D)
 Hamadan Air Base, Hamadan Province
 31st Tactical Reconnaissance Squadron (RF-4E)
 31st Tactical Fighter Squadron (F-4E)
 
 Republic of Korea Air Force – 27 F-4Es in service
 Suwon Air Base, Gyeonggi Province
 153rd Fighter Squadron
 
 Turkish Air Force – 54 F-4E 2020 Terminators in service
 Eskişehir Air Base, Eskişehir Province
111 Filo

Former operators
 
 Royal Australian Air Force (F-4E 1970 to 1973)
 
 Egyptian Air Force (F-4E 1977 to 2020)
 
 German Air Force (RF-4E 1971 to 1994; F-4F 1973 to 2013; F-4E 1978 to 1992)
 
 Hellenic Air Force (RF-4E 1978 to 2017)
 
 Imperial Iranian Air Force (F-4D 1968 to 1979; F-4E 1971 to 1979; RF-4E 1971 to 1979)
 
 Israeli Air Force (F-4E 1969 to 2004; RF-4C 1970 to 1971; RF-4E 1971 to 2004)
 
 Japan Air Self-Defense Force (F-4EJ 1971 to 2021; RF-4E 1974 to 2020; RF-4EJ 1992 to 2020)
 
 Republic of Korea Air Force (F-4D 1969 to 2010; RF-4C 1989 to 2014)
 
 Spanish Air Force (F-4C 1971 to 1990; RF-4C 1978 to 2002)
 
 Turkish Air Force (RF-4E 1980 to 2015)
 
 Aeroplane and Armament Experimental Establishment (F-4K 1970 to 1994)
 Fleet Air Arm (F-4K 1968 to 1978)
 Royal Air Force (F-4M 1968 to 1992; F-4K 1969 to 1990; F-4J(UK) 1984 to 1991)
 
 NASA (F-4A 1965 to 1967; F-4C 1983 to 1985)
 United States Air Force (F-4B 1963 to 1964; F-4C 1964 to 1989; RF-4C 1964 to 1995; F-4D 1965 to 1992; F-4E 1967 to 1991; F-4G 1978 to 1996; QF-4 1996 to 2016)
 United States Marine Corps (F-4B 1962 to 1979; RF-4B 1965 to 1990; F-4J 1967 to 1984; F-4N 1973 to 1985; F-4S 1978 to 1992)
 United States Navy (F-4A 1960 to 1968; F-4B 1961 to 1974; F-4J 1966 to 1982; F-4N 1973 to 1984; F-4S 1979 to 1987; QF-4 1983 to 2004)

Culture

Nicknames

The Phantom gathered a number of nicknames during its career. Some of these names included "Snoopy", "Rhino", "Double Ugly", "Old Smokey", the "Flying Anvil", "Flying Footlocker", "Flying Brick", "Lead Sled", the "Big Iron Sled", and the "St. Louis Slugger". In recognition of its record of downing large numbers of Soviet-built MiGs, it was called the "World's Leading Distributor of MiG Parts". As a reflection of excellent performance in spite of its bulk, the F-4 was dubbed "the triumph of thrust over aerodynamics." German Luftwaffe crews called their F-4s the Eisenschwein ("Iron Pig"), Fliegender Ziegelstein ("Flying Brick") and Luftverteidigungsdiesel ("Air Defense Diesel"). In the RAF it was most commonly referred to as “The Toom” (not tomb).

Reputation
Imitating the spelling of the aircraft's name, McDonnell issued a series of patches. Pilots became "Phantom Phlyers", backseaters became "Phantom Pherrets", fans of the F-4 "Phantom Phanatics", and call it the "Phabulous Phantom". Ground crewmen who worked on the aircraft are known as "Phantom Phixers".

Several active websites are devoted to sharing information on the F-4, and the aircraft is grudgingly admired as brutally effective by those who have flown it. Colonel (Ret.) Chuck DeBellevue reminisced, "The F-4 Phantom was the last plane that looked like it was made to kill somebody. It was a beast. It could go through a flock of birds and kick out barbeque from the back." It had "A reputation of being a clumsy bruiser reliant on brute engine power and obsolete weapons technology."

The Spook

The aircraft's emblem is a whimsical cartoon ghost called "The Spook", which was created by McDonnell Douglas technical artist, Anthony "Tony" Wong, for shoulder patches. The name "Spook" was coined by the crews of either the 12th Tactical Fighter Wing or the 4453rd Combat Crew Training Wing at MacDill AFB. The figure is ubiquitous, appearing on many items associated with the F-4. The Spook has followed the Phantom around the world adopting local fashions; for example, the British adaptation of the U.S. "Phantom Man" is a Spook that sometimes wears a bowler hat and smokes a pipe.

Aircraft on display

As a result of its extensive number of operators and large number of aircraft produced, there are many F-4 Phantom II of numerous variants on display worldwide.

Notable accidents

 On 6 June 1971, Hughes Airwest Flight 706, a McDonnell Douglas DC-9-31 collided in mid-air with a United States Marine Corps F-4B Phantom above the San Gabriel Mountains, while en route from Los Angeles International Airport to Salt Lake City. All 49 on board the DC-9 were killed, while the pilot of the F-4B was unable to eject and died when the aircraft crashed shortly afterwards. The F-4B's Radar Intercept Officer successfully ejected from the plane and parachuted to safety, being the sole survivor of the incident.
 On 9 August 1974, a Royal Air Force Phantom FGR2 was involved in a fatal collision with a civilian PA-25-235 Pawnee crop-sprayer over Norfolk, England. Aircraft Accident Report 975
 On 21 March 1987, Captain Dean Paul Martin, a pilot in the 163d Tactical Fighter Group of the California Air National Guard and son of entertainer Dean Martin, crashed his F-4C into San Gorgonio Mountain, California, shortly after departure from March Air Force Base. Both Martin and his weapon systems officer (WSO) Captain Ramon Ortiz were killed.
 On 30 January 2023, a Greek Air Force F-4E Phantom II crashed into the Ionian Sea. The aircraft was conducting a training exercise when it crashed 46 km south of the Andravida Air Base. The co-pilot, First Lieutenant Marios Michael Touroutsikas was killed. The pilot, Captain Efstathios Tsitlakidis, was also declared dead.

Specifications (F-4E)

See also

References

Notes

Citations

Bibliography
 Angelucci, Enzo. The American Fighter. Sparkford, Somerset, UK: Haynes Publishing Group, 1987. .
 Beit-Hallahmi, Benjamin. The Israeli Connection: Whom Israel Arms and Why. London: I.G. Tauris, 1987. .
 Bishop, Farzad and Tom Cooper. Iranian F-4 Phantom II Units in Combat (Osprey Combat Aircraft #37). Oxford, UK: Osprey Publishing Limited, 2003. .
 Bowers, Peter M. and Enzo Angellucci. The American Fighter. New York: Orion Books, 1987. .
 Burden, Rodney, Michael I. Draper, Douglas A. Rough, Colin R. Smith and David L. Wilton. Falklands: The Air War. London: Arms and Armour Press, 1986. .
 Burgess, Richard E. The Naval Aviation Guide, 4th ed. Annapolis, Maryland: Naval Institute Press, 1985. .
 Calvert, Denis. Le Tigri della RAF (RAF's Tigers)(in Italian). Aerei magazine N.5, Parma, Italy: Delta editrice, 1991.
 Carrara, Dino. Phantom Targets: The USAFs Last F-4 Squadron. Air International, Volume 71, no. 5, November 2006. Stamford, Lincolnshire, UK: Key Publishing, pp. 42–48..
 Cooper, Tom and Farzad Bishop. Target Saddam's Reactor: Israeli and Iranian Operations Against Iraqi Planes to Develop Nuclear Weapons. Air Enthusiast, No. 110, March/April 2004. pp. 2–12..
 Davies, Peter E. USAF F-4 Phantom II MiG Killers 1965-68 (Osprey Combat Aircraft #45). Oxford, UK: Osprey Publishing Limited, 2004. .
 Davies, Peter E. USAF F-4 Phantom II MiG Killers 1972-73 (Osprey Combat Aircraft #55). Oxford, UK: Osprey Publishing Limited, 2005. .
 Deurenberg, Rudd. Shedding Light on Iranian Phantoms. Air Enthusiast, No. 111, May/June 2004, p. 72. 
 Donald, David. RAF Phantoms. Wings of Fame. London: Aerospace. Volume 15, 1999. pp. 4–21. .
 Donald, David and Jon Lake, eds. Desert Storm: The First Phase.  World Air Power Journal. London: Aerospace, Volume 5, Spring 1991..
 Donald, David and Jon Lake, eds. Desert Storm: Gulf Victory. World Air Power Journal. London: Aerospace, Volume 6, Summer 1991..
 Donald, David and Jon Lake, eds. Encyclopedia of World Military Aircraft. London: AIRtime Publishing, 1996. .
 Donald, David and Jon Lake, eds. McDonnell F-4 Phantom: Spirit in the Skies. London: AIRtime Publishing, 2002. .
 Dorr, Robert F. Navy Phantoms in Vietnam. Wings of Fame, Volume 1, 1995. London: Aerospace Publishing. .
 Dorr, Robert F. "McDonnell F3H Demon". Aeroplane. Volume 36, No. 3, March 2008, pp. 58–61. London: IBC.
 Dorr, Robert F. and Chris Bishop, eds. Vietnam Air War Debrief. London: Aerospace Publishing, 1996. .
 Dorr, Robert F. and Jon Lake. Fighters of the United States Air Force. London: Temple Press, 1990. .
 Dorr, Robert F. Phantoms Forever. London: Osprey Publishing Limited, 1987. .
 Eden, Paul ed. The Encyclopedia of Modern Military Aircraft. London: Amber Books Ltd, 2004. .
 Elward, Brad and Peter Davies. US Navy F-4 Phantom II MiG Killers 1965-70 (Osprey Combat Aircraft #26). Oxford, UK: Osprey Publishing Limited, 2001. .
 Elward, Brad and Peter Davies. US Navy F-4 Phantom II MiG Killers 1972-73 (Osprey Combat Aircraft #30). Oxford, UK: Osprey Publishing Limited, 2002. .
 Freeman, CJ and Gunston, Bill Consulting ed. The Encyclopedia of World Airpower. Crown Publishers, 1979. .
 Fricker, John. "Boeing /McDonnell Douglas F-4 Phantom II Current Operators". World Air Power Journal. London: Aerospace, Volume 40, Spring 2000. .
 Green, William and Gordon Swanborough. The Great Book of Fighters. St. Paul, Minnesota: MBI Publishing, 2001. .
 Gimmi, Russell M. Airman: The Life of Richard F. B. Gimmi. Bloomington, Indiana: iUniverse, 2009. .

 Grossnick, Roy and William J. Armstrong. United States Naval Aviation, 1910–1995. Annapolis, Maryland: Naval Historical Center, 1997. .
 Gunston, Bill ed. The Illustrated History of Fighters. New York, New York: Exeter Books Div. of Simon Schuster, 1981. .
 Gunston, Bill Consulting ed. The Encyclopedia of World Airpower. Crown Publishers, 1979. .
 Higham, Robin and Carol Williams. Flying Combat Aircraft of USAAF-USAF (Vol.2). Manhattan, Kansas: Sunflower University Press, 1978. .
 Hobson, Chris. Vietnam Air Losses, USAF, USN, USMC, Fixed-Wing Aircraft Losses in Southeast Asia 1961–1973. North Branch, Minnesota: Specialty Press, 2001. .
Howarth, Alan. Spanish Phantoms and Their Legacy. Air Enthusiast 115, January–February 2005, p. 74 
 Jefford, C.G. RAF Squadrons: A Comprehensive Record of the Movement and Equipment of All RAF Squadrons and Their Antecedents Since 1912:. Shrewsbury, UK: Airlife Publishing, 2nd edition, 2001. 
 Jones, Lloyd S. U.S. Fighters: 1925–1980s. Fallbrook, California: Aero Publishers, Inc., 1975. .
 Knaack, Marcelle Size. Encyclopedia of U.S. Air Force Aircraft and Missile Systems: Volume 1 Post-World War II Fighters 1945–1973. Washington, DC: Office of Air Force History, 1978. .
 Lake Jon. McDonnell F-4 Phantom: Spirit in the Skies. London: Aerospace Publishing, 1992. .
 List, Friedrich. "German Air Arms Review". Air International, Volume 70, No. 5, May 2006, pp. 50–57. Stamford, Lincolnshire, UK: Key Publishing..
 Melampy, Jake. "Phantoms West". Air International, Volume 80, No. 1, January 2011, pp. 36–38. Stamford, Lincolnshire, UK: Key Publishing..
 Nordeen, Lon. Fighters Over Israel: The Story of the Israeli Air Force from the War of Independence to the Bekaa Valley. London: Guild Publishing, 1991. .
 Richardson, Doug and Mike Spick. F-4 Phantom II (Modern Fighting Aircraft, Volume 4) . New York: Arco Publishing, 1984. .
 Swanborough, Gordon and Peter Bowers. United States Military Aircraft Since 1909. Washington, District of Columbia: Smithsonian, 1989. .
 Swanborough, Gordon and Peter Bowers. United States Navy Aircraft since 1911. London: Putnam, 1976. .
 Taylor, Michael J.H. Jane's American Fighting Aircraft of the 20th century. New York: Mallard Press, 1991. .
 Thetford, Owen. British Naval Aircraft since 1912. London: Putnam, Fourth Edition, 1994, pp. 254–255. .
 Thornborough, Anthony M. and Peter E. Davies. The Phantom Story. London: Arms and Armour Press, 1994. .
 Wagner, Ray. American Combat Planes, Third Enlarged Edition. New York: Doubleday, 1982. .
 Wilson, Stewart. Phantom, Hornet and Skyhawk in Australian Service. Weston Creek, ACT, Australia: Aerospace Publications, 1993. .

External links

 F-4 Phantom II history page on Boeing.com
 F-4 Phantom II Society site
 PhantomF4K.org – Fleet Air Arm – Royal Navy site
 F-4.nl site
 Countering Israeli Reaction to F-4 Sales to Saudi Arabia and Kuwait
 8th Tactical Fighter Wing site
 F-4 Phantom II articles and publications, theaviationindex.com
 The Phantom page with images on fas.org
 
 "The Phantom Turns 50" article at Fence Check site
 F-4 Phantom page on Aerospaceweb.org
 RAF Phantom Losses
 The Phantom Zone
 
 Phantom 50th Anniversary Slideshow

 
F-004 Phantom II
1950s United States fighter aircraft
Aircraft first flown in 1958
Carrier-based aircraft
Low-wing aircraft
Twinjets
Articles containing video clips